Albert Omega Sears (February 21, 1910 – March 23, 1990) was an American jazz tenor saxophonist and bandleader, sometimes credited as Big Al Sears.

Sears was born in Macomb, Illinois, United States. His first major gig came in 1928 when he replaced Johnny Hodges in Chick Webb's ensemble. Following this he played with Elmer Snowden (1931–32), then led his own groups between 1933 and 1941. In the early 1940s he was with Andy Kirk (1941–42) and Lionel Hampton (1943-44) before he became a member of Duke Ellington's Orchestra in 1944, replacing Ben Webster. He remained with Ellington until 1949, when first Jimmy Forrest and then Paul Gonsalves took over his chair. He played with Johnny Hodges in 1951–52 and recorded the tune "Castle Rock" with him; the tune became a hit but was released under Hodges's name.

Sears was in Alan Freed's band when Freed did live shows, being introduced as "Big Al Sears." He played as a studio musician on R&B albums in the 1950s and recorded two albums for Swingville in 1960. He also owned several record labels, including Arock, Serock, and Gator.

In 1990, he died in St. Albans, New York, at the age of 80.

Discography

As leader
 Grade A Dance Music with a Swing Beat (Audio Lab, 1960)
 Swing's the Thing (Prestige, 1960)
 Rockin' in Rhythm with Taft Jordan and Hilton Jefferson as the Swingville All-Stars (Prestige, 1960)
 Things Ain't What They Used to Be (Swingville, 1961)

As sideman
 Mildred Anderson, No More in Life (Prestige, 1961)
 Aretha Franklin, Aretha (Columbia, 1961)
 Al Hibbler, After the Lights Go Down Low (Atlantic 1957)
 Johnny Hodges, Castle Rock (Norgran, 1955)
 Johnny Hodges, In a Tender Mood (Norgan, 1955)
 Budd Johnson, Blues a la Mode (Felsted, 1958)
 Jimmy Witherspoon, Goin' to Kansas City Blues (RCA Victor, 1958)

References

Other sources
Scott Yanow, [ Al Sears] at Allmusic
Scott DeVeaux and Barry Kernfeld. "Sears, Al." The New Grove Dictionary of Jazz, 2nd ed. Oxford University Press.

External links

About Al Sears

1910 births
1990 deaths
American jazz bandleaders
American jazz saxophonists
American male saxophonists
Duke Ellington Orchestra members
Groove Records artists
Jazz musicians from Illinois
People from Macomb, Illinois
RCA Victor artists
20th-century American musicians
20th-century saxophonists
American male jazz musicians
20th-century American male musicians